Taiping District is an inner city district in the eastern part of Taichung, Taiwan. It is the second largest district in Taichung City after Heping District.

History 
After the handover of Taiwan from Japan to the Republic of China in 1945, Taiping was organized as a rural township of Taichung County. On 1 August 1996, Taiping was upgraded to a county-administered city due to its population. On 25 December 2010, Taichung County was merged with Taichung City and Taiping was upgraded to a district of the city.

Administrative divisions 
Taiping District consists of 39 villages, which are Taiping, Zhangyi, Yongcheng, Zhongping, Zhongzheng, Pingan, Zhongxing, Yongping, Tungping, Chenggong, Tunghe, Jianguo, Jianxing, Pinglin, Daxing, Qinyi, Guanghua, Guangming, Zhongshan, Fengnian, Yixin, Yijia, Yichang, Xinping, Xinji, Xincheng, Xinguang, Xinxing, Xingao, Xinfu, Toubian, Shenghe, Tungbian, Xinglong, Fulong, Huangzhu, Guanglong, Yonglong and Delong Village.

Geography 
 Area: 120.75 km2
 Population: 196,564 people (February 2023)

Economy 
Taiping District supplies many agricultural products to the Taichung urban area, including
loquats, longans, bananas, and vegetables.

Education 
 National Chin-Yi University of Technology

Tourist attractions 
 Ancient Farm Village Culture Museum
 Bat Tunnel
 Little Cassia Forest
 Public Leisure Park
 Taichung City Tun District Art Center
 Tobiankeng

Sister cities 
Lincoln, Nebraska is Taiping's sister city.

Notable natives 
 Hsieh Yue-hsia, former actress

References

External links 

  

Districts of Taichung